Xbox Game Studios (formerly Microsoft Games, Microsoft Game Studios and Microsoft Studios) is an American video game publisher that acts as a division of technology company Microsoft. The division was created in March 2000 and replaced Microsoft's internal Games Group. This is a list of games that were published by Microsoft through the Games Group and, later, through Xbox Game Studios.

Video games

References

See also 
 List of backward-compatible games for Xbox One and Series X - Some Xbox 360 and original Xbox games may have been released on Xbox One and Xbox Series X/S via backwards compatibility.
 List of Bethesda Softworks video games - Xbox Game Studios acquired ZeniMax Media/Bethesda Softworks and those subsidiaries games are published by Bethesda.

 
Xbox Game Studios